Dennis Mark Wuycik (born March 29, 1950) is a former American basketball player.  He was named to the 1973 ABA All-Rookie team, and averaged 4.4 points per game during his ABA career.

After Wuycik's basketball playing career ended, he started and published The Poop Sheet (later renamed ACC Sports Journal), a popular sports newsletter that initially covered North Carolina schools, but later extended to cover the entire Atlantic Coast Conference.

References

External links

1950 births
Living people
All-American college men's basketball players
American men's basketball players
Basketball players from Pennsylvania
Boston Celtics draft picks
Carolina Cougars players
North Carolina Tar Heels men's basketball players
Parade High School All-Americans (boys' basketball)
People from Ambridge, Pennsylvania
Small forwards
Spirits of St. Louis players